The 2011 TSFA season was the 13th regular season of the Texas Sixman Football League (TSFL).

2011 saw a veteran team return, another change ownership and name and then another leave.  The TSFA continued league play at River City Christian School.

Teams
The Rhinos returned and join the Longhorns as the most tenured teams with their eleventh years of competition.  The Bucs played for their tenth season.  The Wrecking Crew returned for their seventh season.  The Phoenix returned for their fifth seasons.  The Outlawz entered their third season of play and the Tigers competed in their second.  The Renegades switched hands and became the Ravens.

Regular season
The thirteenth year of the TSFA consisted of eight weeks from February 27, 2011 to April 10, 2011.

Week 1
February 27, 2011
Wrecking Crew 20 - Phoenix 0
Outlawz 29 - Bucs 27
Tigers 49 - Rhinos 6
Longhorns 24 - Ravens 18

Week 2
March 6, 2011
Tigers 26 - Outlawz 0
Phoenix 47 - Rhinos 7
Wrecking Crew 13 - Longhorns 25
Bucs 19 - Ravens 33

Week 3
March 13, 2011
Bucs 7 - Longhorns 45
Ravens 32 - Phoenix 19
Tigers 22 - Wrecking Crew 
Rhinos 6 - Outlawz 54 M

Week 4
March 20, 2011
Ravens 34 - Outlawz 19
Tigers 47 - Phoenix 6
Longhorns 20 - Rhinos 0
Wrecking Crew 33 - Bucs 13

Week 5
March 27, 2011
Ravens 32 - Rhinos 26
Tigers 46 - Bucs 13
Wrecking Crew 15 - Outlawz 7
Longhorn 19 - Phoenix 14

Week 6
April 3, 2011
Phoenix 35 - Bucs 20
Outlawz 39 - Longhorns 38
Wrecking Crew 40 - Rhinos 6
Tigers 40 - Ravens 24

Week 7
April 10, 2011
Tigers 34 - Longhorns 14
Bucs 21- Rhinos 6
Ravens 25 - Wrecking Crew 21
Outlawz 47 - Phoenix 12

Playoffs
The thirteenth year of playoffs for the TSFA consisted of the top 6 from the league entering the post season with the top 2 seeds getting a bye week.

Wildcard Round
April 17, 2011
Wrecking Crew 26 - Outlawz 20 2OT
Ravens 48 - Phoenix 20

Conference Championships
May 1, 2011
Longhorns 39 - Ravens 38 OT
Tigers 26 - Wrecking Crew 20

Epler Cup XIII
May 7, 2011
Tigers 43 - Longhorns 37 OT
Epler Cup XIII MVP
Rudy - #19 WR Tigers

Epler Cup XIII Summary
Coming soon...

Regular Season Awards
Offensive Player of the Year: To be announced
Defensive Player of the Year: To be announced
2009 TSFA Regular Season MVP: To be announced

References

External links 
Texas Sixman Football League 

American football in Texas
TSFL